is a train station in the town of Kawanehon, Haibara District, Shizuoka Prefecture, Japan, operated by the Ōigawa Railway.

Lines

Station layout
The station has an island platform serving two tracks, connected to a station building by a level crossing. The station is unattended.

Station history
It was built primarily to support dam construction activities at the nearby Nagashima Dam. On completion of the dam in October 1990, it was renamed to its present name as part of an effort to draw customers to the nearby Sessokyō-Onsen hot springs resort.

Passenger statistics
In fiscal 2017, the station was used by an average of 15 passengers daily (boarding passengers only).

Surrounding area
Oi River
 Sessokyō onsen

See also
 List of Railway Stations in Japan

References

External links

 Ōigawa Railway home page

Stations of Ōigawa Railway
Railway stations in Shizuoka Prefecture
Railway stations in Japan opened in 1959
Kawanehon, Shizuoka